Miss Monday (born 1976) is a Japanese hip-hop and R&B artist.  She sings as well as raps, and has collaborated with other artists such as Sowelu, JAMOSA, and Youngshim. She began her career in 2000, releasing singles on the I.D. Records label before being signed by the Japanese arm of Epic Records, for whom she recorded several albums before parting company with them in 2007. After that, she signed with For Life Music Entertainment until her retirement in 2018.

Discography

Singles
[2000.07.21] 
[2000.12.08] JIKANRYKOU
[2001.11.21] MONDAY FREAK
[2002.02.20] Lady meets girl
[2002.05.09]  feat. Leyona
[2002.07.24] Soul Flower
[2003.04.09] Curious
[2003.05.21] Playground feat. HUNGER
[2004.03.10] Roots feat. Spinna B-ill
[2004.06.23]  feat. Sowelu
[2004.10.06] 
[2005.05.24] 
[2007.07.18] Ohana
[2007.10.03] 
[2009.01.28] The Light feat. kJ from Dragon Ash, Naotarō Moriyama, and PES from RIP SLYME
[2010.03.24]  feat. Sayuri Sugawara

Albums
[2002.03.06] Free Ya
[2003.04.23] NATURAL
[2004.11.03] miss rainbow
[2006.06.21] &I
[2007.07.18] FOOTSTAMP Vol. 1
[2007.12.05] KISS THE SKY
[2009.04.08] Love & The Light (w/a white lie)
[2010.06.23] Beautiful
[2011.07.13] &U

References

External links
Official Website

Japanese women singers
Japanese hip hop musicians
Japanese rappers
Living people
1976 births
People from Yokohama
Musicians from Kanagawa Prefecture